Aunggon is a village in Indaw Township, Katha District, in the Sagaing Region of northern-central Burma. A river runs to the west of the village.

References

External links
Maplandia World Gazetteer

Populated places in Katha District
Indaw Township